Suzanne Treister (born 1958) is a British contemporary artist based in London. Her works are known for being conceptually oriented around emerging technologies. An ongoing focus of her work is the relationship between new technologies, society, alternative belief systems and the potential futures of humanity.

Career
Initially known in the 1980s as a painter, she became a pioneer in digital/new media art from the beginning of the 1990s, creating work about emerging technologies, developing fictional worlds and international collaborative organizations. Some of her early work is considered video game art. Using various media, including video, the internet, interactive technologies, photography, drawing and watercolor, Treister has evolved a large body of work which engages with eccentric narratives and unconventional bodies of research to reveal structures that bind power, identity and knowledge. Her projects, which often span several years, reinterpret given taxonomies and histories to examine the existence of covert, unseen forces at work in the world, whether corporate, military or paranormal.

In 1995 she created an alter ego, Rosalind Brodsky, a time travelling researcher from the 'Institute of Militronics and Advanced Time Interventionality'.

Treister's exhibition "Hexen 2.0" was shown at the PPOW Gallery in Chelsea, New York, in early 2013. Her work is held in private and public collections including Tate Britain; Science Museum, London; Centre Pompidou, Paris; Muzeum Sztuki, Łódź, Poland; and Thyssen-Bornemisza Art Contemporary, Vienna.

Publications and works
 Rosalind Brodsky and the Satellites of Lvov. CD-ROM. [Place not identified]: S. Treister, c1998-2000.
 No Other Symptoms – Time Travelling with Rosalind Brodsky. CD-ROM with book. London: Black Dog Publishing, 1999.
 Hexen 2039 – new military-occult technologies for psychological warfare. London: Black Dog Publishing, 2006. 
 NATO The Military Codification System for the Ordering of Everything in the World. London: Black Dog Publishing, 2008.
 It Is Almost That (box) (contributor). Los Angeles: Siglio, 2011.
 It is Almost That: A Collection of Image + Text Work by Women Artists & Writers (contributor). Los Angeles: Siglio, 2011.
 Hexen 2.0 Tarot. London: Black Dog Publishing, 2012.
 Hexen 2.0. London: Black Dog Publishing, 2012.
 HFT The Gardener. London: Black Dog Publishing, 2016.
 The Spaceships of Bordeaux / Les Vaisseaux De Bordeaux. Silvana Editoriale, Milan, Italy 2017 
 From SURVIVOR (F) to The Escapist BHST (Black Hole Spacetime). Serpentine Galleries and Koenig Books, London Sept 2019

References

Further reading
 The Women Artists Slide Library Journal 22 (April–May 1988).

British video artists
Women video artists
Alumni of Saint Martin's School of Art
Alumni of Chelsea College of Arts
1958 births
Living people
English contemporary artists
British women painters
21st-century British women artists